Yuzi may refer to:

Yuxiong, called Yuzi or Master Yu
 Yuzi (book) :zh:鬻子, attributed to Yuxiong
 Yuzi, East Azerbaijan, Iran
 Yuzi, Fars, Iran
Yuzi, Portuguese rapper